The Strathcona Public Building, Old Strathcona Post Office, South Side Post Office or South Edmonton Post Office is restored heritage building in Strathcona Square in the Old Strathcona heritage district of Edmonton. The restored building along with a Festival Market was opened to the public on the first weekend of September 1988 and the place came to be known as Strathcona Square.

History 
The building was constructed between 1911 and 1913, during a massive building boom in the Edmonton area, and at the same time that the city of Strathcona, Alberta (also called South Edmonton) was being merged into the city of Edmonton.  It was designed by David Ewart, the Chief Architect of the Canadian Department of Public Works in an Edwardian Classical Free style.  The building originally served as a post office and general federal government office building. The building's neat brick and limestone finishing was a remarkable departure from the typical Romanesque style used in earlier post office buildings. Following this newer aesthetic principles, the original tower was found to be short in height, and was replace by one ten feet taller in 1914-1915.

Next to the grain terminal, the Old Strathcona Post Office clock tower stood as the second tallest structure on the south side of Edmonton for many years. Old Strathcona is a five (5) block area on 82 Avenue (Whyte Avenue), at the south side of Edmonton, Alberta, about 2 miles from the University of Alberta. The Old Strathcona Post Office was the first major restoration project undertaken in Edmonton's historic Old Strathcona area. The Old Strathcona Post Office when first restored was modelled after Festival Market development undertaken by the Rouse Corporation in the United States, and Boston's Quincy Market and Faneuil Hall in particular. In  1977 Canada abandoned the Old Strathcona Post Office. The building was placed on the Province of Alberta's register of Grade A Provincial Historic Resources on February 12, 1985. The building sat empty until January 1986 when the City of Edmonton took ownership of the Old Strathcona Post Office for the sum of $1.00.

The building is very similar to the former post office in Regina, which was designed by the same architect.

Restoration 
The City of Edmonton transferred ownership of the building for $1.00 to the Clarion Hospitality Group, a group of companies wholly owned by Albert and Irene Hansen. Then Federal Member of Parliament, Jim Edwards orchestrated $400,000 in Federal grant monies to assist the restoration.  Albert and Barrie Hansen negotiated a $2.0 million loan from Terry Semeniuk, an Edmonton main branch manager at government owned bank, the Province of Alberta Treasury Branch (“ATB”).  Clarion initially sought to convert the Old Strathcona Post Office into three restaurants or pubs, to complement Clarion's growing Western Canadian hotel portfolio. However, Terry Semeniuk opposed this plan and would only finance the project if Clarion agreed to rent out the building as a Retail Market.

Albert Hansen, President of Clarion, resolved to make the Old Strathcona Post Office the finest restoration and adaptive re-use project in Canada. The project included some innovative and expensive engineering.  The building had a three-foot crawl space, and was underpinned by four foot wide foundation walls.  Clarion excavated the crawl space;  underpinned  the foundation; and added a Whyte Avenue facing sidewalk level atrium to bring natural light into a lower level, which was opened as an exclusive Food Market.  A second floor was added to the south facing wing.  A new three-story building with glass-enclosed elevator was added to the west side of the building. These changes added about 60% to the building's usable area.  The design was undertaken by then Edmonton-based, Chandler, Kasian Kennedy Architects.  Structural, mechanical and electrical engineering was undertaken by Stanley Engineering (now Stantec).
The building opened to the public on Labour Day weekend, in September 1988. Doug Enders at Royal Park Realty had the exclusive right to lease out the building.  Three months prior to completion, it became clear that Mr. Enders had not leased any of the building.  Barrie Hansen then undertook to lease out the building.

Ownership and maintenance

 the building has been divided into a number of restaurants and bars.  The top floor is The Billiard Club, a pool hall.  Since the early 1990s the middle floor has been home to Chianti Cafe,  which serves Italian food, and is part of a chain based in Calgary and established in 1984.  The basement floor hosts Squires Pub, a lounge/nightclub.

Tenants at opening included Eric's Framing, Silver Treasures, Bustamante's, Toys Galore, Kringles, Croissant Creations, Macdonald's Coffee, Daisy's Deli and Incredible Edibles. The owner of Incredible Edibles disappeared one week prior to opening.  A few months later, Chianti Café, then with two stores in Calgary, took over the Incredible Edibles space on the ground floor. Chianti Café was an instant success, and today occupies nearly the entire ground floor. The clock and the clock mechanism, originally crafted by Midland Clockworks of the UK, had not worked since before the building was abandoned by the Canadian government in 1977. Clarion shipped the clockworks to  Smith of Derby in England, where the clock mechanism was reconditioned and  recalibrated so that it could be located on the floor of the second story of the building, enclosed in glass, thereby making the clockworks and the inside of the clock tower open to the public, and a unique tourist attraction.

IN 1989, when the Founder of When Pigs Fly, approached Clarion to open their retail store in the Old Strathcona Post Office, the building was fully occupied, so the store opened across Whyte Avenue on the opposite corner of 105th Avenue. The Old Strathcona Post Office became the impetus for the restoration and rejuvenation of Old Strathcona, what is today one of the most liveable areas in Edmonton Alberta.

As the US Federal Reserve raised interest rates from 1988 through 1990, the Province of Alberta Treasury Branch pressured Clarion to sell the Old Strathcona Post Office to cover mounting losses from hotels in oil dependent towns where Clarion owned hotel properties. This despite never missing a payment or even coming close to default.

A few years later, Terry Semeniuk, the senior person for the Province of Alberta Treasury Branch was charged with taking a Secret Commission because he would  pressure his bank clients to sell properties to other Treasury Branch customers who coveted that particular assets. Semeniuk was the subject of, and referenced in several criminal proceedings in the Province of Alberta. This was true of the Old Strathcona Post Office. The Province of Alberta Treasury Branch have made no overtures about restoring the Hansen family property.

References 

Former post office buildings
Government buildings completed in 1913
Provincial Historic Resources in Edmonton
Neoclassical architecture in Canada
Post office buildings in Canada
Canadian federal government buildings
Billiard halls
Music venues in Edmonton
1913 establishments in Alberta
Buildings and structures in Edmonton